East Alliance is an unincorporated community and census-designated place (CDP) in Mahoning County, Ohio, United States. It was first listed as a CDP prior to the 2020 census.

The CDP is in the southwest corner of Mahoning County and the southwest corner of Smith Township. It is bordered to the west by the city of Alliance in Stark County and to the south by Knox Township in Columbiana County. U.S. Route 62, following the Columbiana County line, runs along the south edge of East Alliance; it leads west into Alliance and east  to Salem.

Demographics

References 

Census-designated places in Mahoning County, Ohio
Census-designated places in Ohio